Stathmopoda monoxesta is a moth of the  family Agonoxenidae. It is found in Tahiti.

References

Moths described in 1929
Stathmopodidae
Endemic fauna of Tahiti
Taxa named by Edward Meyrick